The South African type XD tender was a steam locomotive tender from the pre-Union era in the Cape of Good Hope.

The Type XD tender first entered service in 1901, as tenders to the British-built of the three versions of   Tenwheeler type steam locomotive which were acquired by the Cape Government Railways in that year. These locomotives were designated Class 6H on the South African Railways in 1912.

Manufacturer
Type XD tenders were built in 1901 and 1902 by Neilson, Reid and Company.

The original 6th Class locomotive and tender was designed in 1892 by H.M. Beatty, the Locomotive Superintendent of the Cape Government Railways (CGR) Western System at the time, at its Salt River works in Cape Town. The Type XD tender first entered service in 1901, as tenders to 21 new  locomotives which were built for the CGR by Neilson, Reid.

Characteristics

Locomotives
In the South African Railways (SAR) years, tenders were numbered for the engines they were delivered with. In most cases, an oval number plate, bearing the engine number and often also the tender type and locomotive class, would be attached to the rear end of the tender. During the classification and renumbering of locomotives onto the SAR roster in 1912, no separate classification and renumbering list was published for tenders, which should have been renumbered according to the locomotive renumbering list.

Three locomotive classes were delivered new with Type XD tenders, built by the same manufacturer. Bearing in mind that tenders could and did migrate between engines, these tenders should have been numbered in the SAR number ranges as shown.
 1901: CGR 6th Class of 1901 (Neilson's), SAR Class 6H, numbers 614 to 634.
 1902: CGR 6th Class of 1902, SAR Class 6J, numbers 635 to 648.
 1902: CGR 8th Class of 1902, SAR Class 8, first batch, numbers 1069 to 1071.

Classification letters
Since many tender types are interchangeable between different locomotive classes and types, a tender classification system was adopted by the SAR. The first letter of the tender type indicates the classes of engines to which it can be coupled. The "X_" tenders could be used with the locomotive classes as shown.
 CGR Mountain, SAR Class 4.
 SAR Class 4A.
 SAR Class 5.
 CGR 6th Class of 1897, SAR Class 6B.
 Oranje-Vrijstaat Gouwerment-Spoorwegen 6th Class L3, SAR Class 6E.
 CGR 6th Class of 1901 (Neilson, Reid), SAR Class 6H.
 CGR 6th Class of 1902, SAR Class 6J.
 CGR 8th Class of 1902, SAR Class 8.
 Imperial Military Railways 8th Class, SAR Class 8A.
 Central South African Railways Class 8-L2, SAR Class 8B.
 Central South African Railways Class 8-L3, SAR Class 8C.
 CGR 8th Class 4-8-0 of 1903, SAR Class 8D.
 CGR 8th Class Experimental, SAR Class 8E.
 CGR 8th Class 4-8-0 of 1904, SAR Class 8F.
 CGR 8th Class 2-8-0 of 1903, SAR Class 8Y.
 CGR 8th Class 2-8-0 of 1904, SAR Class 8Z.
 Central South African Railways Class 9, SAR Class 9.
 Central South African Railways Class 10, SAR Class 10.
 Central South African Railways Class 10-2 Saturated, SAR Class 10A.
 Central South African Railways Class 10-2 Superheated. SAR Class 10B.
 Central South African Railways Class 10-C, SAR Class 10C.
 Central South African Railways Class 11, SAR Class 11.
 CGR 9th Class of 1903, SAR Class Experimental 4.
 CGR 9th Class of 1906, SAR Class Experimental 5.
 CGR 10th Class, SAR Class Experimental 6.
 SAR Class ME.
 Central South African Railways Mallet Superheated, SAR Class MF.

The second letter indicates the tender's water capacity.

Modifications and rebuilding

Modifications
The original slatted upper sides of the Type XD tender's coal bunker were soon replaced by sheet-metal sides to increase the coal capacity.

Rebuilding
From c. 1925, some Type XD tenders from Classes 6H, 6J and 8 were completely rebuilt by the SAR, by mounting a new upper structure on the existing underframe. These rebuilt tenders had a more modern appearance, with flush sides all the way to the top of the coal bunker.

The program to rebuild several older tender types with new upper structures was begun by Col F.R. Collins DSO, who approved several of the detailed drawings for the work during his term in office as Chief Mechanical Engineer of the SAR from 1922 to 1929. It was continued by his successor, A.G. Watson.

References

XD